Chaetostoma bifurcum is a species of catfish in the family Loricariidae. It is a freshwater fish native to South America, where it is found in the Pacific coastal drainages of Ecuador and Peru, including the basins of the Esmeraldas River, the Guayas River, the Santa Rosa River, and the Tumbes River. It inhabits regions of foothills at an elevation of 100 to 650 m (328 to 2133 ft) above sea level. The species reaches 14 cm (5.5 inches) SL.

References 

bifurcum

Fish described in 2015